Audiodog is the first solo album by former Kiss guitarist Bruce Kulick, released October 23, 2001 by Perris Records. The album was produced by Bruce Kulick and Curt Cuomo, and features Kulick on bass, guitar and vocals, and Cuomo on keyboards and backing vocals. Brent Fitz, with whom Kulick had worked before in the band Union, plays drums on all but two songs, which feature longtime John Mellencamp drummer Kenny Aronoff. Kulick and Cuomo composed, engineered and mixed the album, and it was mastered by Don C. Tyler. Chuck Wright did graphic design and illustrations, with photography by Glen LaFerman.

AllMusic's Greg Prato gave the album 3.5 out of 5 stars; he compares Audiodog to other solo albums released by previous and current members of Kiss around the same time, saying it "is certainly one of the better ones." Prato's review is quoted in Encyclopedia of KISS: Music, Personnel, Events and Related Subjects, as he credits Kulick with:

Erik Rupp, administrator of the Vista Records album review site, calls it "the best Post-KISS solo album from any former member of the group."

The name Audiodog derives from the home studio setting where the album was recorded, with Kulick's dog Joe close by throughout the process. In 2012, a limited edition version of the album was released to commemorate Joe's passing. The re-release included additional tracks "495" (an instrumental from the original EP) and the acoustic, aptly named "Bruce Sings To Joe".

Track listing
All songs written by Curt Cuomo and Bruce Kulick except where noted. Brent Fitz played drums on all tracks except where noted.

Additional tracks on Limited Edition release:

Personnel
 Bruce Kulick - bass, guitar, vocals
 Curt Coumo - keyboards, backing vocals
 Kenny Aronoff - drums
 Brent Fitz - drums

References 

Bruce Kulick albums
2001 albums